Naruszewicz is a surname. Notable people with the name include:

Adam Naruszewicz (1733–1796), Polish-Lithuanian nobleman, poet, historian, dramatist, translator and cleric
Aleksander Krzysztof Naruszewicz (died 1668), Polish nobleman, Lithuanian Deputy Chancellor